Edward or Ed Jackson may refer to:

Arts and entertainment
Edward Jackson (photographer) (1885–1967), American photographer and photojournalist
Edward Jackson (silent film character) (fl. 1914), a character in The $5,000,000 Counterfeiting Plot
Ed Jackson (Coronation Street) (fl. 1978), a character in the British soap opera Coronation Street

Politics and law
Edward B. Jackson (1793–1826), U.S. Representative from Virginia
Edward L. Jackson (1873–1954), American politician, governor of Indiana
Edward Jackson (diplomat) (1925–2002), British diplomat
Ed Jackson (Tennessee politician) (born 1948), American businessman and politician in Tennessee state senate

Sports
Edward Jackson (cricketer, born 1849) (1849–1926), English cricketer
Edward Jackson (American football) (born ca. 1907), American college football coach
Edward Jackson (Delhi cricketer) (born 1922), Indian cricketer
Edward Jackson (footballer) (1925–1996), Australian rules footballer in the VFL
Edward Jackson (cricketer, born 1955) (born 1955), English cricketer
Ed Jackson (rugby union) (born 1988), English rugby player

Others
Edward Jackson (manufacturer) (1799–1872), Canadian tinware manufacturer
Edward Jackson (ophthalmologist), American ophthalmologist

See also
Eddie Jackson (disambiguation)
Edwin Jackson (disambiguation)
Ted Jackson (disambiguation)